Quick Lane Tire and Auto Center is a global automotive chain that provides oil changes, tire rotation, multi-point inspections and other express services. Currently headquartered in Dearborn, Michigan, Quick Lane is owned by Ford Motor Company, there are 825 locations as of February 2018. Some stores are stand-alone operations or some are attached to the dealership. Quick Lane is designed for dealers to pick up additional work to replace deceased warranty work. Quick Lane offers routine vehicle auto services including oil and filter changes, light repair services such as brake repairs and tire replacement.

History 
Quick Lane was launched as a pilot program in 1997 by Ford Motor Company. 80 shops were opened in 2003, boosting locations to 279. In August 2014, Ford and the Detroit Lions announced that Quick Lane would be the title sponsor of the replacement Detroit bowl.

In January 2017, Ford had launched it Omnicraft parts for non-Ford and non-Lincoln vehicles. Quick Lane franchisees thus would not have to order those parts from other distribution outlets thus increasing ordering efficiency and potential decreasing costs. In February 2018, Changan Ford Automobile opened two locations in China, which are the first two company owned locations.

Sponsorships 
Quick Lane began sponsoring the Quick Lane Bowl begin in 2014 for a three year period. In November 2016, Quick Lane extended its sponsorship of the Detroit Lions' bowl for another three years to 2019.

Quick Lane was a sponsor of the Wood Brothers No. 21 Motorcraft/Quick Lane Ford Fusion driven by Ryan Blaney in the 2017 Monster Energy NASCAR Cup Series. In 2018, Paul Menard will be the new driver of the No. 21 car. Blaney will transition to Team Penske.

References

External links 
 

Ford Motor Company
American companies established in 1997
Retail companies established in 1997
Automotive repair shops of the United States
Dearborn, Michigan